The siege of Glatz took place in 1760 during the Third Silesian War (part of the Seven Years' War) when an Austrian force led by General von Laudon laid siege to and successfully stormed the fortress of Glatz (Czech: Kladsko, Polish: Kłodzko) from its Prussian garrison.

On 6 June Laudon surrounded Glatz, but he had to wait until heavy artillery was brought from Olmütz (Olomouc) in neighbouring Moravia. While waiting, Laudon received information about the approach of a Prussian force under Fouqué. With his much larger force Laudon moved to intercept the smaller force, forcing Fouqué to surrender at the Battle of Landeshut on 23 June.

Laudon then returned his attentions to the siege of Glatz. The arrival of his heavy artillery had allowed the  siege to properly begin on 20 July and a trench had been dug. Once the guns had  weakened the defences Laudon was able to organise volunteers to storm the city, opening the gates and allowing the remainder of the Austrian army to enter.

Aftermath
Following a series of extensive manoeuvres and several heavy battles the during 1760 Glatz ultimately remained the only territory captured by the Austrian and their allies leaving the situation almost unchanged since a year before.

The Prussian commander Colonel Bartholomäus d'O was taken prisoner by the Austrians. Following his release at the end of the war he was tried and executed by Frederick the Great as a punishment for losing Glatz.

References

Bibliography
 Szabo, Franz A.J. (2008). The Seven Years War in Europe, 1757-1763. Pearson.

Glatz
Glatz
Glatz
Glatz
Glatz
1760 in Prussia
Glatz
History of Lower Silesian Voivodeship
Kłodzko